Psilalcis albibasis is a moth in the family Geometridae. It is found in India and Taiwan

References

Moths described in 1895
Boarmiini